HD 88133 b is an extrasolar planet orbiting the star HD 88133. It is probably less massive than Jupiter and even Saturn. It orbits the star in a very tight orbit, completing one revolution around the star in every three and half days or so. Despite the relatively large radius of the star (about 2 times Solar), no transits have been detected.

In 2016 the direct detection of the planetary thermal emission spectrum was claimed, but the detection was questioned in 2021.

References

External links
 

Hot Jupiters
Exoplanets discovered in 2004
Giant planets
Leo (constellation)
Exoplanets detected by radial velocity